Alai (born 1959 in Sichuan Province) is a Chinese-language poet and novelist of Rgyalrong Tibetan descent. He is also a former editor of Science Fiction World.

Works
Alai's notable novel Red Poppies, published in 1998, follows a family of Tibetan chieftains, the Maichi, during the decade or so before the “liberation” of Tibet by the People's Liberation Army in 1951. Their feudal life in the Tibetan borderlands, narrated by the youngest "idiot" son, is described as cruel, romantic, and full of intrigue (with the Annexation of Tibet by the People's Republic of China presented as a great advance for the Tibetan peasantry). Red Poppies won the 5th Mao Dun Literary Prize in 2000 and was selected as a finalist for the Kiriyama Prize in 2002.

In 2013, Alai participated in the International Writing Program's Fall Residency at the University of Iowa in Iowa City, IA.

Bibliography

Filmography
The Climbers (2019)

References

External links
 Red Poppies: A Novel of Tibet review by Gang Yue from University of North Carolina

1959 births
Living people
People's Republic of China poets
Writers from Ngawa
Poets from Sichuan
Tibetan poets
International Writing Program alumni
Mao Dun Literature Prize laureates
Chinese male novelists
People's Republic of China novelists
20th-century Chinese novelists
21st-century Chinese novelists
20th-century Chinese male writers
21st-century male writers